4th Dimensional Rocketships Going Up is the first solo studio album by American rapper The Gift of Gab. It was released on Quannum Projects and Epitaph Records on May 11, 2004.

Critical reception
John Bush of AllMusic gave the album 4 stars out of 5, saying, "4th Dimensional Rocketships Going Up delivers what every fan wants to hear: more quality material from one of the best underground rappers in the business." Nathan Rabin of The A.V. Club called it "an album that's simultaneously epic and intimate, personal and political, passionate and playful."

Track listing

Charts

References

External links
 

2004 debut albums
Gift of Gab (rapper) albums
Quannum Projects albums
Epitaph Records albums
Albums produced by Jake One